Franco Emanuel Ledesma (born 3 October 1992) is an Argentine professional footballer who plays as a centre-back for Deportes Iquique.

Career
Ledesma started in Torneo Argentino C with San Jorge. In 2012, Ledesma joined Atlético Concepción of Torneo Argentino B, featuring nine times in two years. Moves to Argentinos and Instituto Deportivo Santiago followed, along with twenty-one appearances in 2013 and 2014. Instituto loaned Ledesma to Sportivo Guzmán in 2014. He returned midway through, subsequently joining Torneo Federal A's Central Córdoba on loan. Appearance two ended drawn with San Martín, though San Martín were later awarded the win due to him being ineligible as his Sportivo Guzmán loan hadn't officially ended.

He departed Instituto permanently in January 2015 to join Mitre, with Ledesma scoring his first goal versus Vélez Sarsfield in the following March. Ledesma spent seven months with Sportivo Patria from January 2016, prior to rejoining Mitre in July. Twenty appearances followed in his first campaign back in 2016–17, a season that ended with promotion to Primera B Nacional. He subsequently made his professional football debut, playing the full duration of a 2–0 defeat to Agropecuario on 18 November 2017. After a 2019–20 stint with Independiente Rivadavia, Ledesma joined Alvarado in July 2020.

Career statistics
.

References

External links

1992 births
Living people
Sportspeople from San Miguel de Tucumán
Argentine footballers
Association football defenders
Torneo Argentino B players
Torneo Federal A players
Primera Nacional players
Primera B de Chile players
San Jorge de Tucumán footballers
Central Córdoba de Santiago del Estero footballers
Sportivo Patria footballers
Club Atlético Mitre footballers
Independiente Rivadavia footballers
Club Atlético Alvarado players
Deportes Iquique footballers